Maud de Braose may refer to:
 Maud de Braose or Maud de St Valéry (1155–1210), wife of William de Braose, 4th Lord of Bramber
 Maud de Braose, Baroness Mortimer (1224–1301), wife of Roger Mortimer, 1st Baron Mortimer
 Maud de Braose (d. 1210), wife of Gruffydd ap Rhys II
 Maud de Braose, daughter of William de Braose, 3rd Lord of Bramber
 Matilda de Braose (Deheubarth) wife of Rhys Mechyll